Mira Ann Smith (or often credited as Myra Smith; October 22, 1924 – August 29, 1989) was an American songwriter, music industry pioneer, record label owner, studio engineer, and multi-instrumentalist.  In 1955, she founded Royal Audio Music, Inc. (a.k.a. Ram Records) and became one of the first women to own her own record company.  Her success led some in the music business to dub her “the female Sam Phillips." Smith is most well known for the songs she wrote with singer/songwriter, Margaret Lewis (Warwick), many of which charted on the Billboard Top 10. Smith and Lewis found their greatest songwriting success with singer, Jeannie C. Riley, and wrote many of her songs including, “The Girl Most Likely”, “Oh Singer”, “The Rib” and “There Never Was a Time.” In addition, Smith and Lewis wrote hit songs for artists such as David Houston ("Mountain of Love"), Margaret Whiting ("I Almost Called Your Name"), and Peggy Scott and Jo Jo Benson ("Soulshake"). Four artists charted on Billboard with the Smith and Lewis song “Reconsider Me”:  Johnny Adams (1969), Ray Pillow (1969), John Wesly Ryles (1971) and Narvel Felts (1975). Smith received six outstanding achievement awards from the Broadcast Music Industry (BMI). In 1988, she was inducted into the Southern Songwriters Hall of Fame, and in 1995 Smith was the first woman inducted into the Women in Music Hall of Fame.

Early life and influences 
Smith was born in 1926 in Alexandria, Louisiana to parents George W. Smith and Beulah Martin Smith. Her mother was a seamstress for The Fashion, Inc., a women's clothing company. She grew up attending the local Baptist church. Smith had two older sisters, Kathleen and Birdie Lee  and from an early age, all three were encouraged to play music. Her parents saved their money and bought Smith an expensive Martin guitar on which she quickly became proficient.

In 1955, Smith was elected president of the newly organized Song Writers Club of Shreveport, which was founded to give young writers the opportunity to introduce their work to the public. The club started with 6 members.

Smith was greatly inspired by Les Paul, both by his guitar playing and his innovations with multi-track studio recording. When the first Les Paul guitar came on the market, she “had to have” one.

Louisiana Hayride 
Smith was a fan and later performed on the Louisiana Hayride, a live radio show recorded from the city auditorium in Shreveport and broadcast on station KWKH. Smith began to notice many Hayride artists were being offered recording contracts and others were looking for a place to record their music. Smith recognized the opportunity to open her own recording studio.

Royal Audio Music, Ram Recording Co. 
In 1955, when Smith was 29, she acquired the building located at 2439 Lakeshore Drive in Shreveport and turned it into Royal Audio Recording studio.  She purchased a single track crown tape recorder, a Neumann U47 microphone, and a Rek-O-Kut acetate disc cutter. Her cousin, Alton Warwick, worked on the carpentry and attached egg crates to the walls as a soundproofing measure. To publicize her new recording services, she placed ads in the local papers and in Billboard magazine.

RAM Records 
In 1955, a short time after opening the studio, Smith started her own record label, Ram Records. Smith discovered RCA made quality custom pressings for Indie labels and began to use their services. Smith scoured most of Louisiana and east Texas,  crossing racial and genre boundaries in her search for talented artists. She recorded musicians performing Country, Rockabilly, Swamp Pop, and R&B.

Ram recording artists included Linda Brannon, Margaret Lewis, Roy “Boogie Boy” Perkins, The Lonesome Drifter, Bobby Page and the Riff Raffs, Endom Spires, June Bug Bailey, Sonny (“Golden Boy”) Williamson II, Carol Williams, Larry Bamburg, James Heubert Wilson, Charlotte Ray Hunter, and many others. Smith utilized the talents of some of the best musicians in Shreveport, many of whom went on to sign contracts with major labels and become highly respected musicians, including James Burton  Joe Osborn, Dale Hawkins, and Jerry Kennedy.

Clif Records 
In 1957 Smith partnered with Cliff Hagin and they added Clif Records as a subsidiary record label. Clif Records' first success was with T.V. Slim (Oscar Wills) and his song “Flat Foot Sam” (Clif #103) written by his wife, Clara Wills. When it was reviewed by Billboard on July 7, 1957, the magazine gave it a 65 or less rating. However, Slim had connections with Leonard Chess and was able to get Checker Records to distribute the song across the nation. Under the Checker Records label (#870), Billboard gave the song a 77 rating. In 2005, Brian Setzer recorded a cover of  "Flat Foot Sam" for his album Rockabilly Riot! Live From the Planet. Chico Chism & His Jetanairs also released “Hot Tamales and Bar-B-Que” on the Clif Label.

K Label 
K Label was another Ram subsidiary record label named after Smith's sister, Katherine. The Lonesome Drifter (Thomas Johnson) and his 1958 single “Eager Boy”/ “Tear Drop Valley” (K-Records #5812) is considered one of the more significant recordings from this label.

Studio struggles 
As a woman in almost completely male industry, Smith often found it difficult to find distribution and promotion services. Her cousin, Alton Warwick, was quoted in 1994 as saying, “(Being a woman) did handicap her, as far as people taking her seriously with things like financing. If she had better funding for distribution and promotion, she could’ve made some of her records really go.” Due to her tight budget, she was only able to promote a few singles each year and was often forced to leave quality songs unreleased. Many of Ram's recordings were forgotten and unreleased for decades.

In 1960, Smith opened a new studio on Greenwood Drive, which included a built-in echo unit and separate vocal booths.

On August 27, 1960 the Louisiana Hayride performed its last show.  Rock and Roll was growing in popularity and the Shreveport music scene was slowing and changing. As a result, the studio began to struggle. Within a few years, Smith closed her studio and moved to Nashville, Tennessee along with many other Shreveport musicians.

Ram Records catalog release 
In 1994, London-based Ace Records, a British reissue label which specializes in American Roots music, released a 6-CD box set which included many previously unreleased songs from the Ram Catalog. Ray Topping, a London native, assembled the collection. He learned about Ram Records in 1969 when he purchased the song “Drop Top” by Roy “Boogie Boy” Perkins. The Ace release received many mentions in the press, including Billboard magazine. NPR’s Alex Chadwick ran a series of interviews about the Ram Records legacy during September and October of 1994.

Songwriting success 
In the early 1960s, Smith teamed up with Margaret Lewis to create a songwriting and publishing partnership. Their first success was a hit for David Houston, “Mountain of Love” (1963) which reached #2 on the US Country charts and #132 on the US Charts.

In 1966, Smith and Lewis moved their studio to Nashville. They joined the Country Music Association and signed a contract with record producer Shelby Singleton’s SSS International Corporation. During an interview with a journalist, Smith and Lewis commented that when looking for songwriting inspiration, they would often go camping in the woods. The pair composed more than 100 songs.

In 1966, they wrote a hit song for Margaret Whiting, “I Almost Called Your Name” (1966, London #115) which spent 16 weeks on the Billboard charts and peaked at #4 on the Billboard Adult Contemporary charts. Several other artists also recorded "I Almost Called Your Name" including Linda Martell (Plantation Records, 1970) and Freddy Fender (ABC Dot 1974).

In 1968 Smith and Lewis wrote four of the songs on Jeannie C. Riley's album, Yearbooks and Yesterday  (Cat# PLP-2)  which peaked at #9 on the 1969 Billboard Hot Country Albums and included their songs “Girl Most Likely” (# 6 on Hot Country Songs, # 55 US Hot 100),  and “Yearbooks and Yesterdays” (#187 on the Billboard 200).

In 1969, Riley recorded the Smith and Lewis songs “There Never Was a Time” (#5 on Hot Country Songs), “The Rib” (#32 on Hot Country songs), “Things Go Better With Love” (#142 on Billboard 200), and “Wedding Cake” for her album Things Go Better With Love. (Plantation Records, #PLP-3). "Wedding Cake" was also recorded by Connie Francis, (MGM, 1969), Connie Smith (RCA Victor, 1969), and Linda Martell (Plantation Records, 1970). Dolly Parton and Porter Wagoner also recorded a duet of, "There Never Was A Time" for their RCA Records album, "Always, Always" (1969) On March 15, 1969, “There Never Was a Time” was included in the Billboard Top 60 Spotlight.

Riley's hit songs, “Oh Singer” (#4 on the Hot Country Songs, #74 on US Hot 100) and “Country Girl” (#7 on Hot Country, #106 Billboard 200), were also written by Smith and Lewis.

In 1969, Smith and Lewis’ song “Reconsider Me” became a hit for R&B singer Johnny Adams. His rendition peaked at #8 on the Billboard R&B charts and #28 on the Billboard Hot 100. Also in 1969, the song was a hit for Country artist Ray Pillow and peaked at #38 on the Billboard Country Charts. In 1971, “Reconsider Me” was the title track of John Wesly Ryles' Plantation Records album, hitting #39 on the Country Charts. In 1975, Narvel Felts released a cover of “Reconsider Me.” His version charted at #1 on Canada's RPM Country charts, spent 6 weeks on the US charts, and peaked at #67 on the Billboard Hot 100. Smith and Lewis also recorded themselves performing this song, but their version wasn't released until 1994, five years after Smith's death. (Ace #CDCHD 495).

Also in 1969, Jo Jo Benson and Peggy Scott recorded the Smith and Lewis song, “Soulshake” which peaked at #37 on the Billboard US Pop charts and #13 on the US R&B charts. Several other artists recorded this song including Conway Twitty and Loretta Lynn (MCA Records, 1977), Delaney & Bonnie and Friends (ATCO/Atlantic Records 1970), and Bruce Willis (Motown Records, 1989).

Awards and recognitions 
Smith was the recipient of six BMI Awards for her songs “The Girl Most Likely”, “Mountain of Love”, “Oh Singer”, “Reconsider Me”, There Never Was a Time” and “Wedding Cake”.

In 1988, Smith was inducted into the Southern Songwriters Hall of Fame, and in 1995 she was the first woman inducted into the Women in Music Hall of Fame.

Pseudonyms 
Smith was a talented guitarist and pianist and her playing can be heard on many Ram releases, but she often used the aliases Grace Tennessee and Laura Martin (writing credits), or changed the spelling of her name to Myra in the song/album credits.

Death 
In 1986, Mira wrote and played guitar for her last recording “Wings Like Eagles.” In 1988, she moved back to Shreveport, and in 1989 she died of leukemia. While many sources report her death as September 29, 1989, her obituary in the Shreveport Times is dated August 29, 1989.

Songwriting hits

References

1920s births
1989 deaths
American songwriters